Avidyne Corporation is an avionics company based in Melbourne, Florida. Avidyne is developer of Integrated Avionics Systems, multi-function displays, and traffic advisory systems for light general aviation (GA) aircraft. Headquartered in Melbourne, Florida, the company has facilities in Melbourne, as well as Concord, Massachusetts; Columbus, Ohio; and Boulder, Colorado.

History
President and CEO Daniel J. Schwinn founded Avidyne in 1994. Avidyne pioneered the standalone MFD market when they certified their first Flight Situation Display system in 1997.  Avidyne's FlightMax Entegra line was released in 2003—the first big-glass flight deck system for light general aviation aircraft. On November 3, 2005, Avidyne Corporation and Ryan International Company announced a merger of the two companies. Ryan International was founded in 1981 by CEO Paul Ryan, inventor of the Stormscope weather system.

Avidyne was recognized as Avionics Magazine's "Small Manufacturer of the Year" and was inducted into the Avionics Magazine Hall of Fame in 1999.  Avidyne received the NASA 2001 Commitment to Excellence Award for their work on the AGATE HITS program for their work on “Highway in the Sky” (HITS) display technology, as part of NASA's AGATE (Advanced General Aviation Transport Experiments) Alliance. Avidyne successfully demonstrated HITS technology at EAA AirVenture 2001 in Oshkosh, Wisconsin.  In 2017, Avidyne Corporation certified Synthetic Vision capability for all of its IFD-Series GPS-based Flight Management Systems.

Products

 Helios Flight Management System for Helicopters
Atlas Flight Management System
Entegra & Entegra Release 9 Integrated Flight Deck Systems
 IFD550 FMS/GPS/NAV/COM
 IFD540 FMS/GPS/NAV/COM
 IFD440 FMS/GPS/NAV/COM
 AMX240 Audio Panel
 AXP340 Mode S Transponder w/ADS-B OUT
 AXP322 Mode S Remote Transponder w/ADS-B OUT
 EX600 MultiFunction Display (MFD)
 SkyTrax100 ADS-B IN Receiver
 TWX670 Color Tactical Lightning Detection System
 CMax Electronic Approach Charts & Airport Diagrams
 TAS600 Series Traffic Advisory Systems
 DFC90 Autopilot

See also
L-3 Communications
Garmin

References

External links
 www.avidyne.com

Aerospace companies of the United States
Avionics companies
Technology companies established in 1994
Manufacturing companies established in 1994
Companies based in Brevard County, Florida
Manufacturing companies based in Florida
Melbourne, Florida